The Miles-Hanna House, located at 206 Charter in Delhi, Louisiana, was built in 1892.  It was listed on the National Register of Historic Places in 1996.

It is a frame one-story Queen Anne house with Eastlake details.

It was built in 1892 for Harriet Purvis Miles and Frank A. Miles, Sr., who had married on October 28, 1891.  It remained in the family until 1989.  The house was deemed to be a local landmark, and it was noted that "while a middle-class Queen Anne cottage of the type represented by the Miles-Hanna House would be typical in many Louisiana communities, it stands out in Delhi."

In 1996 the house was owned by the town of Delhi and was operated as a local history museum.

References

Houses on the National Register of Historic Places in Louisiana
Queen Anne architecture in Louisiana
Houses completed in 1892
Richland Parish, Louisiana